Jacaré, Portuguese for "alligator", may refer to:

People
 Ronaldo Souza (born 1979), Brazilian jiu-jitsu practitioner and mixed martial artist, nicknamed Jacaré
 Romero Cavalcanti (born 1952), Brazilian jiu-jitsu instructor, nicknamed Jacaré
 Edson Cardoso, a pagode dancer, nicknamed Jacaré

Brazil 
 Barra do Jacaré
 Jacaré (Rio de Janeiro), a neighborhood of Rio de Janeiro, Brazil
 Jacaré dos Homens
 Santana do Jacaré

Rivers
Jacaré River (disambiguation), several rivers
Jacaré Grande River, a river of Pará state in Brazil
Jacaré-Pepira River, a river of São Paulo in southeastern Brazil

Other
 Jacaré (film), a 1942 American film directed by Charles E. Ford
 Yacare caiman, a species of caiman found in central South America
 Qualea dichotoma (also known as "jacaré"), a species of tree found in southern Brazil
 Arena do Jacaré, a football stadium in Sete Lagoas, Minas Gerais state